David José Moreno Ramos (born 13 April 2000) is a Venezuelan footballer who plays as a midfielder for Angostura FC.

Career

Club career
Moreno was born in Puerto Ordaz of the Ciudad Guayana in Venezuela. He started his career with Mineros de Guayana, where he played on youth level and never got his first team debut. However, he was on the bench for two Copa Venezuela games in August 2016.

After two years with Chicó de Guayana, Moreno moved to Colombian Categoría Primera B club Boyacá Chicó. Moreno made a total of three appearances, two in the league and one in the cup. He returned to Venezuela for the 2020 season, signing with Venezuelan Primera División side LALA FC. In April 2021, he signed with Angostura FC.

References

External links
 
 

Association football midfielders
Venezuelan footballers
Venezuelan expatriate footballers
Venezuelan Primera División players
Categoría Primera B players
A.C.C.D. Mineros de Guayana players
Boyacá Chicó F.C. footballers
Venezuelan expatriate sportspeople in Colombia
Expatriate footballers in Colombia
Living people
2000 births
People from Ciudad Guayana